Gonystylus is a southeast Asian genus of about 30 species of hardwood trees also known as ramin, melawis (Malay) and ramin telur (Sarawak).

Description
Ramin is native to Malaysia, Singapore, Indonesia, Brunei, the Philippines, and Papua New Guinea, with the highest species diversity on Borneo. It is related to Arnhemia, Deltaria, Lethedon and Solmsia.

Ramin is a medium-sized tree, attaining a height of about 24 m (80 ft) with a straight, clear (branch-free), unbuttressed bole about 18 m (60 ft) long and 60 cm (2 ft) in diameter. The trees are slow-growing, occurring mainly in swamp forests.

Species
 The Plant List recognises 32 accepted species:

 Gonystylus acuminatus  
 Gonystylus affinis  
 Gonystylus areolatus  
 Gonystylus augescens  
 Gonystylus bancanus  
 Gonystylus borneensis  
 Gonystylus brunnescens  
 Gonystylus calophylloides  
 Gonystylus calophyllus  
 Gonystylus confusus  
 Gonystylus consanguineus  
 Gonystylus costalis  
 Gonystylus decipiens  
 Gonystylus eximius  
 Gonystylus forbesii  
 Gonystylus glaucescens  
 Gonystylus keithii  
 Gonystylus lucidulus  
 Gonystylus macrocarpus  
 Gonystylus macrophyllus  
 Gonystylus maingayi  
 Gonystylus micranthus  
 Gonystylus nervosus  
 Gonystylus nobilis  
 Gonystylus othmanii  
 Gonystylus pendulus  
 Gonystylus punctatus  
 Gonystylus reticulatus  
 Gonystylus spectabilis  
 Gonystylus stenosepalus  
 Gonystylus velutinus  
 Gonystylus xylocarpus

Uses

The white wood, harder and lighter in colour than many other hardwoods, is often used in children's furniture, window blinds, dowels, handles, blinds, and decorative mouldings.

Because of its straight, clear grain, nowadays it is commonly used in Venice for the construction of oars.

However, over-exploitation has led to all species of ramin being listed as endangered species, particularly in Indonesia and Malaysia. An estimated 90% of ramin in recent international trade is illegally logged.As the ramin forests themselves come under attack, the fragile ecosystems they support are also at risk. These trees provide the main habitat for other priority species such as the orangutan and the Indochinese, Sumatran and Malayan tigers.

Sumatra
Sumatra's peat swamp forests are an important habitat for ramin trees. The Sumatran ramin tree species are CITES protected species. The logging and trade of ramin has been illegal in Indonesia since 2001. Internationally, any illegal trade in Indonesian ramin is prohibited under the UN Convention on International Trade in Endangered Species (CITES). Indonesian government maps show that 800,000ha (28%) of Sumatra's peat swamp forest was cleared between 2003 and 2009. Some 22% of this
clearance was in areas currently allocated to APP's log suppliers.

See also 
 Asia Pulp & Paper

References

External links
Species Survival Network factsheet  (pdf file)
CITES

 
Malvales genera